David Lee Ragan (born December 24, 1985) is an American professional stock car racing driver. He last competed part-time in the NASCAR Cup Series, driving the No. 15 Ford Mustang for Rick Ware Racing, and is also an analyst for NASCAR on Fox on NASCAR Race Hub.

Ragan was born in Unadilla, Georgia, the son of former racer Ken Ragan, and began his racing career racing in the Bandolero Series at age 12. Four years later, he began competing in the Goody's Dash Series with Cam Strader. After one year, he moved to the Legends Pro-Division to race for Mark Martin. He concluded the season by finishing fourth in the point standings. At age 18, Ragan began racing in the Camping World Truck Series, Nationwide Series, and the ARCA Racing Series.

In 2007, he moved up to the Sprint Cup Series, replacing Mark Martin in the No. 6, and driving for Roush Fenway Racing. Between 2007 and 2011, he has recorded 30 top-tens in the series.

On July 2, 2011, Ragan won his first career Sprint Cup Series race, the Coke Zero 400 at Daytona International Speedway. His second win, the Aaron's 499 at Talladega Superspeedway in May 2013, was also the first win for Front Row Motorsports.

Racing career

1996–2002
Ragan was born in Unadilla, Georgia in December 1985, the son of former racer Ken Ragan. Ragan started his racing career in the Bandolero Series at age 12. During the following year, he won twelve races and the National Championship. In 1999, he won the National Championship for the second time. In 2001, Ragan began racing in the Goody's Dash Series with Cam Strader. During the season, the two built late models for Ragan to use in 2002. In 2002, he began racing in the Legends Pro-Division for Mark Martin. At the end of the season, he finished fourth in the final point standings.

2003–2006

At age 18, Ragan moved to the Craftsman Truck Series, as well as the Busch Series and the ARCA Re/Max Series. During his first career start in the ARCA Series, he qualified in the second position, but failed to finish the race after having a tire failure. His first race in the Craftsman Truck Series was at Texas Motor Speedway, where he qualified 28th and finished in the 20th position for Fiddleback Racing. During the season, he failed to qualify for one race, and failed to finish six of the ten races he participated in. Ragan also ran one Busch Series race at Homestead Miami Speedway, finishing 31st, after starting 36th. In the following season, he participated in Roush Racing: Driver X as the co-driver of the No. 6 Roush Racing Ford F-150 in the Truck Series. After participating in 19 events in the series, he recorded one top-five, eight top-ten finishes, and earned one pole position.

Also in 2005, Ragan participated in three Busch Series events, as well as 19 ARCA Racing Series events, where he won one race, and record three pole positions, eight top-five and 11 top-ten finishes. During the 2006 season, he participated in three Busch Series events, and two Nextel Cup Series events. He also participated in 19 Truck Series events, where he recorded two pole positions, one top-five, and eight top-ten finishes.

2007–2011

For the 2007 season, Ragan moved to the Nextel Cup Series as the driver of the number 6 Roush Fenway Racing Ford Fusion. He also participated for the NASCAR Rookie of the Year standings in both Nextel Cup and Busch Series, where he finished second in the Nextel Cup Series, while winning the award in the Busch Series. During the Cup season, Ragan recorded two top-five finishes, with one being in the 2007 Daytona 500, and three top-tens, finishing 23rd in the point standings. During the Busch Series season, he earned two pole positions, four Top 5's, and nine Top 10's, while finishing fifth in the final point standings. Also in 2007, he participated in one ARCA Racing Series event, where he finished in the fourth position.

In 2008, he raced in the Sprint Cup Series, the Nationwide Series, as well as in two ARCA Racing Series events. In the Cup season, he recorded six Top 5's and 14 Top 10's, while finishing 13th in points. During the Nationwide season, he got seven top-fives and 21 top-ten finishes. Ragan clinched fourth in the final point standings. One year later in 2009, he participated in only the Cup Series and the Nationwide Series. During the 2009 NASCAR Sprint Cup Series season, he recorded zero Top 5's and two Top 10's and finished 27th in points. However, in the 2009 NASCAR Nationwide Series season, he won two races, and earned five Top 5's and 15 Top 10's, while finishing 18th in points.

During 2010, he only participated in the Sprint Cup Series. He recorded zero top fives, only three top-ten finishes, and finished 24th in points once the season concluded. In 2011, he began the year almost winning the Daytona 500, but he got penalized for moving lanes before he crossed the line on the restart with two laps to go. On May 21, 2011, he won the Sprint Showdown at Charlotte Motor Speedway, passing Brad Keselowski with two laps to go.

He won the Coke Zero 400 on July 2, 2011, for his first career Sprint Cup win after getting a late push from teammate Matt Kenseth. He was eligible to compete in the "wild card" to get himself into the Chase for the Sprint Cup. After bad finishes a few weeks before the final race before the Chase at Richmond, he finished 4th but was 54 points away from 13th to put himself into a Chase position. At the end of the 2011 season UPS, Ragan's primary sponsor on the Roush Fenway Racing No. 6 Ford, announced that they would no longer sponsor the No. 6 and that the company would scale back its racing program next season, leaving the number 6 team without sponsorship and ultimately forced the camp to shut down, making Roush Fenway Racing a 3-car team for the 2012 season.

2012–2014

In January 2012, Ragan signed with Front Row Motorsports to drive the No. 34 Ford for the team in 2012. He drove for GC Motorsports International in the season-opening Nationwide Series event at Daytona. Ragan got off to a bad start with FRM, crashing out on lap 2 of the Daytona 500 and finishing last. He would eventually go on to finish 28th in Cup Series points.

Ragan started the 2013 season with a rotating roster of sponsors. He started the season wrecked at the Daytona 500 (along with his two other teammates, David Gilliland and Josh Wise) and had no finish better than 20th in the first nine races. However, during the Aaron's 499, Ragan started the green–white–checker restart in 10th-place. On the last lap, teammate Gilliland was able to help push him past Jimmie Johnson, Matt Kenseth, and Carl Edwards to win the race. This was his first win with Front Row Motorsports and the team's first Sprint Cup win, as well as the first NASCAR win for his sponsor for that race, Farm Rich.  The 34 team improved more in 2013 earning sixteen top-25 finishes including the win, a 12th-place finish at the Irwin Tools Night Race at Bristol Motor Speedway, and a sixth-place finish at the fall Talladega race.  However, three consecutive engine failures during the Chase dropped Ragan to 28th in points.

For 2014, Ragan returned to the Front Row Motorsports No. 34 to run the full season with sponsorship from Farm Rich and CSX. In the Nationwide Series, Ragan joined Biagi-DenBeste Racing in the No. 98 Ford for several races throughout the season. Ragan got his first top-10 finish on a non-restrictor plate track with Front Row Motorsports in the 2014 Goody's Headache Relief Shot 500 at Martinsville Speedway by gambling on track position with 5 laps to go in the race. It was his first top-10 of the season and came with a paint scheme paying tribute to the late Wendell Scott, who had also driven the number 34. Ragan finished 32nd in points.

2015
Ragan returned to Front Row Motorsports in 2015. Ragan's owner points were given to new teammate Cole Whitt, but Ragan raced his way into the Daytona 500, finishing 17th in the race.

Joe Gibbs Racing
After the 500, Ragan was tapped by Joe Gibbs Racing to take over the No. 18 Toyota for several races while Kyle Busch was out with leg injuries.

At Atlanta, Ragan nursed the No. 18 to an 18th-place finish. This was followed by a 22nd-place finish at Las Vegas and a 21st-place finish at Phoenix. At Auto Club, he made moves on several late restarts to take a 15th-place finish. At Martinsville, Ragan took the best finish of his stint with JGR with a fifth-place run. This was followed by a 13th-place finish at Texas.

At Bristol, Ragan started in 11th-place. However, he was caught up in a crash on lap 312 and finished 41st, 76 laps down. At Richmond, he started 10th and finished 23rd, two laps off the lead lap.

At Talladega, Ragan started in ninth place. However, he sustained severe damage in the Big One on lap 47 and finished 38th, 65 laps down.

The nine races in which Ragan participated entitled him to a one-fourth share (nine races) of Sprint Cup championship team bonuses, as the No. 18 team won the 2015 championship, worth $1,197,075 for his championship efforts.

With Erik Jones replacing Kyle Busch for the July Xfinity race at Daytona, Ragan drove the No. 20 Interstate Batteries Toyota and was running well until he was caught in an accident late in the race.

Michael Waltrip Racing

Ragan was originally scheduled to return to Front Row after his stint at JGR was over. However, it was announced on April 28 that beginning at Kansas, the No. 18 would be handed to rookie Erik Jones until Busch's return, while Ragan would move to Michael Waltrip Racing and drive their No. 55 car for the remainder of the season, beginning at Kansas.

At Kansas, Ragan was involved in a two-car accident on lap 121 with Josh Wise and finished 33rd, four laps down. At the Coca-Cola 600, he started seventh and was running well until his engine blew up with 47 laps to go, leaving him with a 41st-place finish.

At Dover, he started 15th and finished 13th. At Pocono, Ragan started 21st and finished 23rd. At Michigan, Ragan fell off the lead lap and was scored 35th when the race was called for rain.

At Sonoma, Ragan started in ninth. He'd be involved in two wrecks during the day. On lap 30, when coming out of Turn 7, Martin Truex Jr. forced him into the grass. When Ragan's car got back onto the racing surface, he clipped Truex from behind, sending Truex into the tire barriers. Later, following a restart on lap 79, Ragan was racing alongside Carl Edwards for position when, coming through the esses in the same spot as Truex's crash, Edwards' car bounced over the outside curb, sending him into Ragan, and sending both cars into the jersey barriers on the inside of the track. Ragan finished 39th.

Returning to Daytona for the Coke Zero 400, Ragan started eighth. He was involved in a single-car spin on the back straightaway on lap 149 after contact with Landon Cassill but was able to recover and finish 12th. At Kentucky, he started 25th and finished 18th. This was followed by a 21st-place finish at Indianapolis, a 17th-place finish at Pocono, and a 23rd-place finish at Watkins Glen. After the race at Homestead, in which Ragan finished 27th, MWR closed its doors leaving Ragan without a ride.

2016

On January 19, 2016, it was announced that Ragan would drive the No. 23 Dr. Pepper Toyota Camry for BK Racing. The No. 23 team struggled mightily, as the team's engines did not have enough speed to be competitive every week. Ragan's best result with the BK team in 2016 was a 16th-place finish at the Coke Zero 400. During late summer, Ragan was thrown into the spotlight after Chris Buescher, driving Ragan's old No. 34 at FRM, won at Pocono while trailing Ragan for 30th in points. The battle between Buescher and Ragan for 30th (and therefore Chase eligibility for Buescher) became a focal point of the lead-up to the Chase. Buescher ended up qualifying for the Chase, while Ragan dropped several spots to finish 33rd overall in Sprint Cup points, a career-worst, and marking his first season without at least one Top 10 finish. Ragan parted ways with BK Racing after the season.

For the 2nd year in a row, Ragan drove in relief for Joe Gibbs Racing in the July Xfinity race at Daytona, driving the No. 18 Toyota replacing Matt Tifft, out on medical leave. Ragan sat on the pole, but crashed on the last lap, and finished 21st.

2017

After departing BK Racing following his worst career points finish, Ragan returned to Front Row Motorsports, where he drove from 2012 to 2015, to drive the No. 38. His first race back at FRM resulted in a 25th-place finish in the Daytona 500 after he was involved in a crash while running in the Top 5. His first Top 10 in over a year came at the GEICO 500 at Talladega, where he finished 10th after avoiding the Big One late in the race and making daring four-wide passes on Denny Hamlin, Kyle Larson, Ty Dillon, Clint Bowyer, and Chris Buescher all on the final lap. This result boosted him up five spots in the point standings to 28th.

Ragan continued his string of good momentum with a 17th-place finish at the spring race at Kansas, his third consecutive Top 20 finish, boosting him to 27th in the point standings. While his Top 20 streak ended at Charlotte Motor Speedway, where he finished 23rd, it allowed him to maintain 27th in the standings. His momentum abruptly ended at Dover, where a late crash with five laps to go relegated him to a 30th-place finish and sent him back to 29th in the overall standings. Ragan was up front with a handful of laps to go at Daytona in July in a position to score his third career win. He led the race with two laps to go, ultimately getting passed by Ricky Stenhouse Jr., who ended up winning the race. Ragan was the only driver to score both stage points in both stages and left Daytona with a Top 10 finish, where he finished 6th.

After a few subpar mid-20s finishes, Ragan bounced back with a 17th-place finish in the Bass Pro Shops NRA Night Race after running as high as 12th in the race. Ragan was headed for another Top 20 finish in the Bojangles' Southern 500, running as high as 15th early in the race, but fell to 25th after a spin and two cut tires. Ragan received quite some attention at Dover in the fall, benefiting from an early caution to race his way into the Top 5, then went on to finish ninth in Stage 1 for his first stage points since Daytona in July. Ragan remained on the lead lap for much of the event and finished the race in the 21st position.

Upon the series' return to Talladega in October, Ragan moved from his 33rd starting position to the front early. Despite involvement in several crashes throughout the evening, Ragan posted his 3rd Top 10 of the season, matching his Talladega result in the spring. Ragan ended the 2017 season with a 17th-place finish at Homestead-Miami Speedway and a 30th-place finish in the point standings.

2018

On December 14, 2017, it was announced that Ragan would return to the team in 2018, with new teammate Michael McDowell who previously was also a teammate in Watkins Glen 2013 when he drove the No. 34 and McDowell drove the No. 35 car.

After a crash in the Daytona 500, Ragan rattled off three consecutive Top 25 finishes at Atlanta, Las Vegas, and Phoenix, the latter of which gave him his best start and finish to date, qualifying 16th and finishing 22nd. Ragan had a series of six consecutive Top 25 finishes From Atlanta to Texas. The Bristol weekend was a big success for Ragan so far in 2018, where he was fastest in final practice and finished on the lead lap in 12th place. Ragan was on pace to have another Top 15 run at Richmond until a flat tire in the final ten laps sidelined him to a 33rd-place finish.

As always happens whenever the series visits Talladega Superspeedway, Ragan and his FRM team were expected to be contenders. He posted his best qualifying effort of the season by starting 12th, then overcame an early speeding penalty to finish 6th, his first Top 10 of the season. Two more Top 20s followed at Kansas and Pocono before his momentum was halted by an early race crash at Michigan precipitated by Bubba Wallace. After a career-best 22nd-place finish at Sonoma Raceway, Ragan suffered numerous mechanical issues in the race at Chicagoland Speedway and struggled to a 38th-place finish, nearly 80 laps off the pace.

When the series returned to Daytona International Speedway in July, Ragan was immediately picked by many to be a dark horse for the win. However, a crash early in the race dashed Ragan's hopes for victory. His team still did an incredible job repairing the #38 and Ragan finished the event in 15th position. Ragan rebounded with a solid 18th-place run at Kentucky Speedway after driving up to as high as 12th in the race and later getting a 19th-place finish at Pocono Raceway, a 17th-place finish at Bristol Motor Speedway, and an 18th-place finish at Darlington Raceway. After a couple of mediocre finishes, Ragan finished 16th at Charlotte Motor Speedway, 19th at Kansas Speedway, and 18th at Martinsville Speedway, rebuilding momentum for the end of the season.

After two consecutive 20th-place finishes at ISM Raceway and Homestead-Miami Speedway, Ragan finished 25th in the overall 2018 standings, ranking 31 points ahead of teammate Michael McDowell in 26th and 42 ahead of Ty Dillon in 27th. This is Ragan's best finish with FRM and his best overall since 2011, his last year with Roush Fenway Racing.

2019: Final season
On November 27, 2018, it was announced Ragan would return for a sixth season with FRM to drive the No. 38 in 2019. A strong run at the 2019 Daytona 500 for the No. 38 team was ruined by a late-race accident that relegated them to a 30th-place finish, but the team rebounded the next weekend at Atlanta with a 16th-place finish. The Las Vegas weekend gave Ragan his best starting spot in several years, as the No. 38 lined up on the outside of the third row in 6th after a stellar qualifying performance. At the 2019 Coca-Cola 600 at Charlotte, Ragan and the No. 38 team enjoyed their best race in quite some time, running in the Top 10 all race and leading in the late stages before fading to 15th at the finish after a late-race restart.

On August 14, 2019, Ragan announced that he would be retiring from full-time competition to focus on his family. At Kansas, Ragan qualified second, his team's best qualifying effort on a non-restrictor plate track, behind pole-sitter Daniel Hemric.

2020–present: Part-time racing

In his retirement announcement, Ragan affirmed he was still open to racing part-time. On January 10, 2020, he announced that he would compete in the Daytona 500 with Rick Ware Racing, who partnered with Front Row Motorsports for this race to field Ragan's entry in the renumbered No. 36 Ford (usually the No. 53). The No. 36 was previously run by FRM teammate Matt Tifft in 2019 until the team scaled back operations. As part of this deal, FRM then leased the charter for the No. 36 (which they had kept for Ragan at the Daytona 500, giving him a guaranteed starting spot in the race) to RWR to use for the No. 53 for the remainder of the season. Ragan would qualify 30th in the 500 and go on to finish fourth, his first top-five since 2015 and his best ever finish in a Daytona 500, despite damage from one of the Big Ones occurring during the race.

After retiring, Ragan transitioned into a test driver role for Ford Performance, which included simulator testing and assisting in development of the Next Gen car. In June, he was on the entry list to make his first Truck Series start since 2006 when he joined DGR-Crosley at Atlanta; the attempt was initially planned for Richmond until it was postponed due to the COVID-19 pandemic. However, due to random draw and the entry list exceeding 40 entries, the truck did not make the field. A second attempt at Michigan also failed for the same reason. Ragan would finally appear in a Truck race in September at Darlington, where he finished 22nd. He switched from Cup to Truck points prior to the following week's race at Richmond to be eligible to compete.

Ragan returned to FRM in the No. 36 for the 2021 Daytona 500, although this year it was not in a partnership with Rick Ware Racing or another team with a charter. This meant that Ragan instead had no charter and had to race his way in through his Duel qualifying race.

Ragan returned to Rick Ware Racing in 2022, this time in their No. 15, attempting the 2022 Daytona 500, finishing 8th, his fourth career top-10 finish in a Daytona 500.

Broadcasting
Ragan has appeared as a rotating contributor on NASCAR on Fox's NASCAR Race Hub show for multiple seasons, both when he was driving for Front Row Motorsports and after his retirement from full-time driving. Ragan was open to doing more TV (or radio) work in 2020, the first year after his last full season in the Cup Series, but he remained with Fox on Race Hub.

Personal life
He is married to Jacquelyn; they have two daughters. He is also a Freemason; he was raised to the Master Mason degree on May 22, 2012, at Williams Lodge in Cornelius, NC.

Motorsports career results

NASCAR
(key) (Bold – Pole position awarded by qualifying time. Italics – Pole position earned by points standings or practice time. * – Most laps led.)

Cup Series

Daytona 500

Xfinity Series

Gander RV & Outdoors Truck Series

 Season still in progress
 Ineligible for series points
 Switched to Truck Series points prior to Richmond

ARCA Re/Max Series
(key) (Bold – Pole position awarded by qualifying time. Italics – Pole position earned by points standings or practice time. * – Most laps led.)

Rolex Sports Car Series

Grand Touring
(key) Bold – Pole Position. (Overall Finish/Class Finish).

Notes

References

External links

 
 

Living people
1985 births
People from Dooly County, Georgia
Racing drivers from Georgia (U.S. state)
NASCAR drivers
ARCA Menards Series drivers
Rolex Sports Car Series drivers
People from Huntersville, North Carolina
RFK Racing drivers
Joe Gibbs Racing drivers
Michael Waltrip Racing drivers
ARCA Midwest Tour drivers